The 2002 British Formula Ford Championship was the 27th edition of the British Formula Ford Championship. It commenced on 1 April at Brands Hatch and end on 22 September at Donington Park after 10 rounds and 18 races, all in support of the British Touring Car Championship.

Drivers and teams

Race calendar and results

Drivers' Championship

References

External links
 The home of the British Formula Ford Championship 

British Formula Ford Championship seasons
Formula Ford